is a 1955 Japanese drama film directed by Tomu Uchida.

Plot 
Amidst endless construction and aircraft noise, a family whose father died slowly disintegrates. While daughter Tamiko struggles with her stepmother Nobuko's attempts to marry her off to careless physician Ihura, her bed-ridden brother Junjirō grieves for his ex-wife Keiko who left him for another man. Although Ihura is more interested in Nobuko, he has a short-lived affair with Tamiko, who herself cares only for Ihura's future social and financial status. After selling the family's last remaining properties, Tamiko and Junjirō refuse to give Nobuko her share. Nobuko moves out of the house, announcing that she will take legal steps against her stepchildren's decision. Shortly before his death, Junjirō confesses to Tamiko that he lost the family's money and the mortgaged house in ill-fated stock market investments.

Cast 
 Rentarō Mikuni as Shōnosuke Ihura
 Yumeji Tsukioka as Nobuko Shiga
 Mie Kitahara as Tamiko
 Jūkichi Uno as Tetsutarō Komatsu
 Nobuo Kaneko as Junjirō
 Harue Tone as Keiko
 Bokuzen Hidari as Hota
 Masao Shimizu as Fujita
 Tanie Kitabayashi as aunt
 Osamu Takizawa as uncle

References

External links 
 

1955 films
1955 drama films
Japanese drama films
Films based on Japanese novels
Films directed by Tomu Uchida
Nikkatsu films
Japanese black-and-white films
1950s Japanese films